Anglo-Latin literature is literature from Britain  originally written in Latin. It includes literature written in Latin from parts of Britain which were not in England or English-speaking: "Anglo-" is used here as a prefix meaning British rather than English.

Authors and style
Chroniclers such as Bede (672/3–735), with his Historia ecclesiastica gentis Anglorum, and Gildas (c. 500–570), with his De Excidio et Conquestu Britanniae, were figures in the development of indigenous Latin literature, mostly ecclesiastical, in the centuries following the withdrawal of the Roman Empire around the year 410.

Adomnán's (627/8–704) most important work is the Vita Columbae, a hagiography of Columba, and the most important surviving work written in early medieval Scotland. It is a vital source for knowledge of the Picts, as well as an insight into the life of Iona Abbey and the early medieval Gaelic monks. The life of Columba contains a story that has been interpreted as the first reference to the Loch Ness Monster.

Written just after or possibly contemporarily with Adomnán's Vita Columbae, the Vita Sancti Cuthberti (c. 699–705) is the first piece of Northumbrian Latin writing and the earliest piece of English Latin hagiography. The Historia Brittonum composed in the 9th century is traditionally ascribed to Nennius. It is the earliest source which presents King Arthur as a historical figure, and is the source of several stories which were repeated and amplified by later authors.

In the 10th century the hermeneutic style became dominant, but post-conquest writers such as William of Malmesbury condemned it as barbarous.

See also

Early medieval
Aldhelm (c. 639 – 709)
Stephen of Ripon
Vita sancti Wilfrithi 
Alcuin 
Asser

High medieval
Orderic Vitalis (1075 – c. 1142)
William of Malmesbury (c. 1080/1095 – c. 1143)
Geoffrey of Monmouth (1100 – c. 1155), Historia Regum Britanniæ
John of Salisbury (c. 1120 – c. 1180)
Gervase of Tilbury (c. 1150 – c. 1228)
Gerald of Wales (1146–1243)
Michael Scot (1175 – c. 1232)
Alexander of Hales (c. 1185 – 1245)
Roger Bacon (c. 1214 – 1294)
Duns Scotus (c. 1266 – 8 November 1308)
William of Ockham (c. 1288 – c. 1348)
Richard Rolle (c. 1305 – 1349)

Late medieval and renaissance

Johannes Gower (John Gower, c. 1330 – October 1408), Vox Clamantis
Thomas Morus (Thomas More, 7 February 1478 – 6 July 1535), Utopia
George Buchanan (February 1506 – 28 September 1582)

Modern literature
Francis Bacon (22 January 1561 – 9 April 1626), Novum Organum
John Barclay (28 January 1582 – 15 August 1621), Argenis
Thomas Hobbesius (Thomas Hobbes, 5 April 1588 – 4 December 1679)
Arthur Johnston  (c. 1579–1641)  
John Johnston (1570?–1611) 
John Milton (9 December 1608 – 8 November 1674), Defensio pro Populo Anglicano, De Doctrina Christiana
Isaac Newton 4 January 1643 – 31 March 1727, Philosophiæ Naturalis Principia Mathematica
Vincent Bourne (1695 – 1747)

See also
British literature
Dictionary of Medieval Latin from British Sources
Hermeneutic style
Hiberno-Latin
Latin literature
Literature in the other languages of Britain
Traditional English pronunciation of Latin

References

Further reading

 Reprinted with a supplement in 2001.

Latin-language literature
Latin
Scottish literature
Welsh literature
Literature of England